Giorgio De Luca (born 19 June 1984 in Palermo) is an Italian weightlifter. De Luca represented Italy at the 2008 Summer Olympics in Beijing, where he competed for the men's lightweight class (69 kg). Unfortunately, De Luca did not finish the event, as he successfully lifted  in the single-motion snatch, but failed to hoist  in the two-part, shoulder-to-overhead clean and jerk. He is also a member of the weightlifting team for Gruppo Sportivo Fiamme Oro, and is coached and trained by Sergio Mannironi.

References

External links
 

Italian male weightlifters
1984 births
Living people
Olympic weightlifters of Italy
Weightlifters at the 2008 Summer Olympics
Sportspeople from Palermo
Mediterranean Games bronze medalists for Italy
Mediterranean Games medalists in weightlifting
Competitors at the 2005 Mediterranean Games
Weightlifters of Fiamme Oro
20th-century Italian people
21st-century Italian people